Derry John Murkin (born 27 July 1999) is an English professional footballer who plays as a left-back for Eredivisie club FC Volendam.

Career
Having scored 15 goals in all competitions for Jong Volendam who compete in the Derde Divisie, Murkin made his first team debut for Volendam on 18 January 2019 as a substitute in a 3–1 loss to FC Eindhoven in the Eerste Divisie.

Murkin made his breakthrough in the 2020–21 season, as he was repositioned as a left-back under head coach Wim Jonk. He made six goals and provided seven assists in 32 total appearances that season, and his performances earned him the award of FC Volendam Talent of the Season.

Personal life
Murkin was born in Colchester before his mother's job saw his family relocate to the Netherlands at the age of four.

Career statistics

Club

Honours
Individual
 FC Volendam Talent of the Season: 2020–21

References

1999 births
Living people
English footballers
English expatriate footballers
Association football fullbacks
Eredivisie players
Eerste Divisie players
Tweede Divisie players
Derde Divisie players
FC Volendam players
Expatriate footballers in the Netherlands
English expatriate sportspeople in the Netherlands
Sportspeople from Colchester